The 1992 Stanford Cardinal football team represented Stanford University in the 1992 NCAA Division I-A football season. The Cardinal played in the Pacific-10 Conference and were coached by Bill Walsh. Walsh served as Stanford's coach for two seasons (1977 and 1978) before leaving to coach the NFL's San Francisco 49ers to three Super Bowl championships. He retired from coaching in 1989, worked briefly as a broadcaster, and then returned to coach Stanford to a #9 ranking and a Blockbuster Bowl victory.

Schedule

Schedule source:

Roster

Season summary

California

Stanford wins share of Pac-10 title

References

Stanford
Stanford Cardinal football seasons
Pac-12 Conference football champion seasons
Cheez-It Bowl champion seasons
Stanford Cardinal football